The 2011 NCAA Division II women's basketball tournament involved 64 schools playing in a single-elimination tournament to determine the national champion of women's NCAA Division II college basketball as a culmination of the 2010–11 basketball season.

Qualification and tournament format
The champions of the 22 basketball conferences qualified automatically. An additional 42 teams were selected as at-large participants by the selection committee. The first three rounds of the tournament were organized in regions comprising eight participants in groups of two or three conferences (two in the Central and Midwest regions).  The eight regional winners then met at the Elite Eight for the final three rounds held at the St. Joseph Civic Arena in St. Joseph, Missouri.

Automatic qualifiers
The following teams automatically qualified for the tournament as the winner of their conference championships:

Qualified teams

Regionals

South – Russellville, Arkansas
Location: Tucker Coliseum Host: Arkansas Tech University

Midwest – Houghton, Michigan
Location: Student Development Center Gymnasium Host: Michigan Technological University

South Central – Tahlequah, Oklahoma
Location: Dobbins Fieldhouse Host: Northeastern State University

West – Pomona, California
Location: Kellogg Gymnasium Host: California State Polytechnic University, Pomona

Central – Durango, Colorado
Location: Whalen Gymnasium Host: Fort Lewis College

Atlantic – Edinboro, Pennsylvania
Location: McComb Fieldhouse Host: Edinboro University of Pennsylvania

East – Waltham, Massachusetts
Location: Dana Center Host: Bentley College

Southeast – Morrow, Georgia
Location: Athletics & Fitness Center Host: Clayton State University

Elite Eight – St. Joseph, Missouri 
Location: St. Joseph Civic Arena Host: Missouri Western State University

See also
 2011 NCAA Division I women's basketball tournament
 2011 NCAA Division III women's basketball tournament
 2011 NCAA Division II men's basketball tournament
 2011 Women's National Invitation Tournament
 2011 NAIA Division I women's basketball tournament
 2011 NAIA Division II women's basketball tournament

References
 2011 NCAA Division II women's basketball tournament jonfmorse.com

NCAA Division II women's basketball tournament
NCAA tournament